Michael Edward Redenbach (born 1 November 1949) is a former Australian rules footballer who played with North Melbourne in the Victorian Football League (VFL).

Redenbach was a blond haired half forward-flanker who arrived to North Melbourne from Bairnsdale.

He won the Gardiner Medal in 1970, on a count-back, from Melbourne's Paul Callery.

At the end of the 1973 VFL season, Redenbach was one of the players traded to the Perth Football Club, so that North Melbourne could secure three time Sandover Medal winner Barry Cable.

References

External links

Michael Redenbach's playing statistics from WAFL Footy Facts

1949 births
Australian rules footballers from Victoria (Australia)
North Melbourne Football Club players
Perth Football Club players
Bairnsdale Football Club players
Living people